Edmond Jean François Barbier (16 January 1689 – 29 January 1771) was a French 
jurisconsult of the parliament and author of a  historical journal of the time of Louis XV.  He was born in Paris.

Works 
 Chronique de la régence et du règne de Louis XV (1718–1763)

1689 births
1771 deaths
18th-century French historians
French male non-fiction writers
Writers from Paris